Homalium patoklaense is a species of plant in the family Salicaceae. It is found in Ivory Coast and Gabon.

References

patoklaense
Vulnerable plants
Taxonomy articles created by Polbot